France Info (stylized as franceinfo:) is a French domestic rolling news channel which started broadcasting on 31 August 2016 at 6:00 p.m. on the Web. TV broadcasting began on 1 September 2016 at 8:00 p.m. on most TV operators (Bouygues Telecom, Orange, SFR, Numericable...), and on the TNT (Digital Terrestrial Television).

France Info involves France Télévisions, Radio France, France Médias Monde (with France 24) and the Institut national de l'audiovisuel (INA). It shares its name with a global news service which gathers the TV channel itself, the radio channel France Info and the website www.francetvinfo.fr. France Info broadcasts from 06:00 seven days a week until 00:00 and simulcasts France 24 overnight. France Info can be watched live on YouTube (with a 12-hour rewind availability) and web.

Background 
After LCI, CNEWS and BFMTV (available on free national DTT), and France 24 (worldwide and in Île-de-France only), France Info is the fifth rolling news channel in France.

The goal of France Info is to distance itself from the competition by focusing heavily on straight news coverage, hoping to offer a higher-quality news service. The channel's music was produced by French composer, Jean-Michel Jarre.

France Info is supported by France Télévisions, in particular France 2 and 3. The channel has 204 employees (176 at France Télévisions, 28 at Radio France), as well as 3,000 journalists distributed among the editorial teams of France 2, France 3 Régions, Réseau Outre-Mer première, Franceinfo, France Inter and France 24. Its total budget is 15 million euros for France Télévisions and 3.5 million euros for Radio France.

It includes the characteristic elements of rolling news channels (live bulletins, distinctive daypart-separated blocks) and debate and analysis programs. The sister radio station provides headline reminders three times each hour at :20, :40 and :50 past (four times an hour at :10, :20, :40 and :50 past between September 2016 and mid-January 2017), France 24 fills in the overnight programming (that would otherwise be filled in by continuous repeats of the day's last live newscast), and Ina offers magazines on "the news seen through a historical eye".

France Info thus becomes a global public-service news offering that brings together radio and television and makes use of the experience of the public service as a whole in terms of information.

This is the first major collaboration between public radio and television since 1975; at that time France Inter supplied the footage in the bulletins of the 3e chaîne couleur de l'ORTF (now France 3).

Programs 
Unlike other news channels, France Info can be watched without sound, thanks to some reports being text-heavy. Journalists can explain the stories using an interactive touchscreen. The cameraman moves along with the journalists, with a mobile device accompanied. The tone is mostly offbeat, without forgetting to be serious if required. The presentation - done in a studio integrated directly into the newsroom by an anchorman and/or anchorwoman, serving as both news anchors and segment introducers - as well as the interactivity with the "Le Live" thread seen on the channel's website, are other distinctive differences.

 France 24 - world news in simulcast with France 24
 franceinfo: et tout est plus clair - flagship banner for weekday afternoon and weekend rolling news block
 la matinale - breakfast rolling news block with Samuel Étienne and Clémence de la Baume
le fil info 10:30/13:00 - morning rolling news block with Louis Laforge and Marianne Théoleyre
le fil info 14:00/17:00- afternoon rolling news block with Sophie Le Saint
17h:info - grand boulletin with Djamel Mazi
18h:20h - evening rolling news block with Lucie Chaumette
21:23h - night rolling news block with Alexandra Uzan
Le 23h - final bulletin prior to overnight France 24 simulcast, introduced to help replace Soir 3 which previously aired on France 3 with Patricia Loison (Monday-Friday) and Sorya Khaldoun (Saturday and Sunday/Friday(Replacement))
 Le journal - hourly live news bulletins, last 12 minutes
 l'essentiel de l'info - bottom-of-the-hour headlines between 6:50am and 10:30pm

From Maison de la Radio  
 8.30 franceinfo - Political interview with various guest by Marc Fauvelle and Sahlia Brakhlia (Weekdays), Ersin Leibowitch (Saturday and Sunday)
 Les informés du matin - Morning news debates with Marc Fauvelle and Renaud Dély at 9am 
 L'invité éco - Economic Interview with Jean Leymarie
 Les informés de Franceinfo - Nightly news debates with Jean-François Achilli (Weekdays), and Olivier de Lagarde (Weekends) at 8pm.
 Questions politiques - Sunday political interview, simulcast with France Inter

Presenters

Studio Gilles Jacquier (from France Télévisions)

Main presenters 
 Samuel Étienne (6:30–8:30)
Louis Laforge (10:30–13:00)
Sophie Le Saint (14:00–16:30)
 Djamel Mazi (17:00–17:50)
Lucie Chaumette (18:00–19:50)
Alexandra Uzan (21:00–22:45)
Patricia Loison (23:00–00:00)
Sorya Khaldoun (weekends 21:00–00:00)
 Myriam Bounafaa (weekends 6:30–10:00)

Newsreaders 
 Clémence de la Baume (6:00–9:00)
 Camille Grenu (weekends 6:30–10:00)
 Christophe Gascard
Cassandre Mallay
 Claire Giroud
Jean-Cristophe Galeazzi
Martin Baumer (weekends 10:00–13:30)
 Marianne Théoleyre (10:30–13:00)
 Sébastien Thomas
Murielle Rousselin
Alizé Lutran
David Delós
 N'fanteh Minteh
Pauline Forgue
 Frédérique Hénaut
Florent Boutet
Siegrid Piérard de Misouard
Flore Maréchal
Anaïs Hanquet
Muriel Gensse

Studio "L'Info" (from Maison de la Radio) 
Staff present live headlines every 30 minutes on TV and radio :

 Agathe Mahuet
 Yasmina Adila
Armël Balôgog
 David Dauba
 Diane Ferchit
Thomas Benech
Melanie Delanuay
Edward Marguier
 Gilles Halais
Margaux Caroff
Olivia Chandioux
 Victor Matet
 Stéphane Milhomme
Emmanuel Langlois

References

External links 
 Official Site 
 France Télévisions Corporate site 
 Radio France site 
 France Médias Monde site 
 Institut national de l'audiovisuel site 

France Télévisions
France Médias Monde
Radio France
Television channels and stations established in 2016
Television stations in France
24-hour television news channels in France
2016 establishments in France
French-language television stations